The 2006Tennis Channel Open was a men's tennis tournament played on outdoor hard courts in Las Vegas, Nevada in the United States that was part of the ATP International Series of the 2006 ATP Tour. It was the 19th edition of the tournament and was held from February 27 to March 6, 2006. Fifth-seeded James Blake won the singles title.

Finals

Singles

 James Blake defeated  Lleyton Hewitt 7–5, 2–6, 6–3
 It was Blake's 1st title of the year and the 9th of his career.

Doubles

 Bob Bryan /  Mike Bryan defeated  Jaroslav Levinský /  Robert Lindstedt 6–3, 6–2
 It was Bob Bryan's 2nd title of the year and the 28th of his career. It was Mike Bryan's 2nd title of the year and the 30th of his career.

References

External links
 ITF tournament edition details

 
Tennis Channel Open
Tennis Channel Open
Tennis in Las Vegas
Tennis Channel Open
Tennis Channel Open
Tennis Channel Open
Tennis Channel Open